Marjorie Heins (b.1946) is a First Amendment lawyer, writer and founder of the Free Expression Policy Project.

Education
Heins received a B.A., with distinction, from Cornell University in 1967. She received her J.D. (magna cum laude) from Harvard Law School in 1978. She was admitted to the bar of Massachusetts in 1978 and New York in 1993.

Career
Heins started as a journalist in the 1970s in San Francisco on publications including the underground San Francisco Express Times.  She was also an anti-war activist during the Vietnam War.

American Civil Liberties Union
In the 1980s as staff counsel at the Massachusetts chapter of the American Civil Liberties Union (ACLU), Heins litigated numerous civil rights matters, including LGBT rights and free speech. One matter involved a litigation against Boston University for the discharge of the Dean of Students on the basis of her complaints about discrimination on the part of the university. This story is told in Cutting the Mustard (1988). Heins also investigated the Boston Police Department's treatment of the notorious Carol Stuart murder case, in which a white man murdered his wife but claimed to be a victim of a carjacking by an African American man.

From 1989 to 1991, she served as editor-in-chief of the Massachusetts Law Review. In 1991–92, she was chief of the Civil Rights Division at the Massachusetts Attorney General's Office.

She founded and directed the Arts Censorship Project at the American Civil Liberties Union from 1991 to 1998, during the years in which arts censorship were a particularly controversial and active field. During that time, she worked on a number of high-profile arts censorship matters. Heins was co-counsel on the ACLU's Reno v. ACLU brief to the U.S. Supreme Court, which ultimately led to striking the Communications Decency Act as an unconstitutional violation of the First Amendment. Heins was also co-counsel on Karen Finley's landmark lawsuit against the National Endowment for the Arts, National Endowment for the Arts v. Finley.

Academics
Heins has taught at Boston College Law School, Florida State University College of Law, the University of California-San Diego (UCSD), New York University (NYU), Tufts University, and the American University of Paris.

At UCSD, she created courses in "Censorship, Culture and American Law" and "Political Repression and the Press: Red Scares in U.S. History and Law." At NYU, she taught "Censorship and American Culture."  At the American University of Paris, she taught "Free Expression and the Media: Policy and Law."

She was a fellow at NYU's Brennan Center for Justice, 2004–2007.  In 2011, she was a fellow at NYU's Frederic Ewen Academic Freedom Center while researching her book, Priests of Our Democracy: The Supreme Court, Academic Freedom, and the Anti-Communist Purge.

She is currently an adjunct professor in the Department of Media, Culture, and Communication of NYU's Steinhardt School of Culture, Education, and Human Development.

Cases Litigated 
Heins' litigation includes:

 Urofsky v. Gilmore, 216 F.3d 401 (4th Cir. 2000) (argued for professors challenging constitutionality of Virginia law restricting access to sexually explicit material on work computers)
 National Endowment for the Arts v. Finley, 524 U.S. 569 (1998) (ACLU co-counsel for artists challenging NEA funding criteria as impermissibly viewpoint-based and vague)
 Reno v. American Civil Liberties Union, 521 U.S. 844 (1997) (ACLU co-counsel for coalition challenging Communications Decency Act, which restricted "indecent speech" on the Internet)

Bibliography 
 Books
 Priests of Our Democracy: The Supreme Court, Academic Freedom, and the Anti-Communist Purge (New York:  NYU Press, 2013)
 Not in Front of the Children: 'Indecency', Censorship, and the Innocence of Youth (2001; 2007)
 Sex, Sin and Blasphemy: A Guide to America's Censorship Wars (1993; rev. 1998)
 Cutting the Mustard: Affirmative Action and the Nature of Excellence (1988)
 Strictly Ghetto Property: The Story of Los Siete de la Raza (1972)

 Other works
 "Banning Words: A Comment on 'Words That Wound'", 18 Harvard Civil Rights-Civil Liberties Law Review 585 (Summer 1983)
 "In Memoriam: Benjamin Kaplan," 124 Harvard Law Review 1351 (2011).

Awards and honors 
 1991 - Luther McNair Award (Civil Liberties Union of Massachusetts) for significant contributions to civil liberties
 1992 - "First Amendment Hero" (Boston Coalition for Freedom of Expression)
 1993 - "First Amendment Hero" (Boston Coalition for Freedom of Expression)
 2002 - Eli M. Oboler Award (American Library Association) for best published work in intellectual freedom for Not in Front of the Children (2002)
 2013 - Hugh M. Hefner First Amendment Award, for Priests of Our Democracy: The Supreme Court, Academic Freedom, and the Anti-Communist Purge
 Nov. 21, 2013 - 23rd Davis, Markert, Nickerson Lecture on Academic and Intellectual Freedom

References

External links 
 NYU:  Marjorie Heins
 NYU Press:  Authors - Heins, Marjorie
 alternet.org Authors - Heins, Marjorie
 Interview with Heins, Feb. 14, 2013
Marjorie Heins Papers, Tamiment Library and Robert F. Wagner Labor Archives at New York University

American women lawyers
American lawyers
American legal writers
Copyright activists
Cornell University alumni
Free speech activists
Harvard Law School alumni
Living people
1946 births
American women non-fiction writers
21st-century American women